Morgan Schmitt (born January 3, 1985) is an American former professional road racing cyclist, who competed professionally between 2007 and 2013, and in 2018.

Born in Ellensburg, Washington, Schmitt currently resides in Seattle, Washington, United States. Schmitt is a University of Washington graduate.

Major results
Sources:

2007
 8th Road race, National Under-23 Road Championships
2009
 1st Stage 1 Sea Otter Classic
2010
 4th Overall Tour de Beauce
2012
 2nd Overall Sea Otter Classic
 10th Overall Redlands Bicycle Classic
2013
 3rd Overall Sea Otter Classic
 10th Overall Nature Valley Grand Prix
2015
 9th Overall Joe Martin Stage Race
2016
 7th Overall Joe Martin Stage Race

References

External links 

Morgan Schmitt: Cycling Base
Morgan Schmitt: Cycling Quotient

American male cyclists
Cyclists from Washington (state)
1985 births
Living people
People from Ellensburg, Washington